Devard Loran Darling (born April 16, 1982) is a former Bahamian-American wide receiver of American football. After playing college football at Florida State University and Washington State, he was drafted by the Baltimore Ravens in the third round of the 2004 NFL Draft and went on to play for the Kansas City Chiefs and Houston Texans.

Early years
Born in the Bahamas, Darling attended  Nassau Christian Academy before relocating to the United States.  He attended Stephen F. Austin High School in Sugar Land, Texas and won three varsity letters in football, two in track, and one in basketball. In football, he won All-District honors and was named the 28th best prospect in the state of Texas by SuperPrep.

College career
Darling attended Florida State University until the death of his identical twin brother, Devaughn Darling.  After his brother died during practice, due to exhaustion, possibly tied to a sickle cell trait, FSU doctors would not clear him medically to return to the football team.  He subsequently transferred to Washington State University, and finished his career with 105 receptions for 1,630 yards (15.7 yards per reception average) and 30 receiving touchdowns.

Professional career

Baltimore Ravens
Devard Darling was drafted by the Baltimore Ravens in the third round of the 2004 NFL Draft. He signed a three-year contract worth about $1.5 million with the team on July 26, 2004. He was placed on injured reserve on October 29 due to a heel injury. Darling missed most of 2005 and 2006 to injuries as well. 
He was tendered to a one-year contract worth $850,000 on March 1, 2007. On September 27, he was fined $7,500 by the league for an unsportsmanlike conduct penalty he received in week 3 after following Yamon Figurs into the stands following a touchdown. He had a breakout game on November 18, 2007 against the Cleveland Browns with four catches for 107 yards and his first NFL touchdown.

Darling had 20 catches for 331 yards and three touchdowns in his career with the Ravens.

Kansas City Chiefs
On March 11, 2008, Darling signed a three-year contract with the Kansas City Chiefs. On September 7, Darling broke free for what looked to be a game-tying touchdown against the New England Patriots, but he was tackled on 5-yard line. Kansas City ended up losing the game. He ultimately would score only one touchdown while with the Chiefs. He was placed on injured reserve on September 1, 2009. He was released by the Chiefs on March 3, 2010.

Omaha Nighthawks
Darling was signed by the Omaha Nighthawks of the United Football League on September 8, 2010.

Houston Texans
On August 8, 2011, Darling signed with the Houston Texans. He was released on September 3, 2011.

Personal life
Darling is the younger brother of Bahamian track athlete Dennis Darling and the brother-in-law of his wife Tonique Williams-Darling.

Devard's twin brother, Devaughn Darling, died in 2001 due to football practice conditions at Florida State.  His family is still waiting for the Florida Legislature to pass a Claims Bill to receive the money they are owed from the settlement with FSU.

References

External links
 Just Sports Stats
 Kansas City Chiefs bio
 Washington State Cougars bio
 College Football; Alone, a Twin Plays on With a Singular Purpose
 The story of the Darling twins was related at length in the article "Soul Survivor" by Gary Smith for Sports Illustrated [December 2, 2002 issue], later reprinted in the book The Greatest Football Stories Ever Told (pp. 19–37), Ed. Eric Noe.

1982 births
Identical twins
Living people
Sportspeople from Nassau, Bahamas
People from Sugar Land, Texas
Bahamian players of American football
American football wide receivers
Florida State Seminoles football players
Washington State Cougars football players
Baltimore Ravens players
Kansas City Chiefs players
Omaha Nighthawks players
American twins
Twin sportspeople
Bahamian twins